Paul Cooper (born 24 December 1975) is an English footballer who played in the Football League for Darlington.

References

1975 births
Living people
Footballers from Darlington
English footballers
Association football midfielders
Darlington F.C. players
English Football League players